Iravati River may refer to:

 Ravi River, a transboundary river crossing North-Western India and Eastern Pakistan
 Ayeyarwady River or Irrawaddy River, from north to south through Myanmar

Ancient Indian rivers